Kurgak (Körkäk) is a rural locality (a village) in Bolshekachakovsky Selsoviet, Kaltasinsky District, Bashkortostan, Russia. The population was 186 as of 2010. There are 3 streets.

Geography 
Kurgak is located 34 km southeast of Kaltasy (the district's administrative centre) by road. Malokachakovo is the nearest rural locality.

References 

Rural localities in Kaltasinsky District